The Kratos XQ-58 Valkyrie is an experimental stealthy unmanned combat aerial vehicle (UCAV) designed and built by Kratos Defense & Security Solutions for the United States Air Force Low Cost Attritable Strike Demonstrator (LCASD) program, under the USAF Research Laboratory’s Low Cost Attritable Aircraft Technology (LCAAT) project portfolio. It was initially designated the XQ-222. The Valkyrie successfully completed its first flight on 5 March 2019 at Yuma Proving Ground, Arizona.

Development and design

The XQ-58 Valkyrie falls within the USAF Research Laboratory’s Low Cost Attritable Aircraft Technology (LCAAT) portfolio, whose objectives include designing and building unmanned combat aerial vehicles (UCAVs) faster by developing better design tools and maturing and leveraging commercial manufacturing processes to reduce build time and cost. The role of the LCAAT is to escort the F-22 or F-35 during combat missions, and to be able to deploy weapons or surveillance systems. 

The XQ-58 is designed to act as a "loyal wingman" that is controlled by a parent aircraft to accomplish tasks such as scouting, defensive fire, or absorbing enemy fire if attacked. It features stealth technology with a trapezoidal fuselage with a chined edge, V-tail, and an S-shaped air intake. The XQ-58 is capable of being deployed as part of a swarm of drones, with or without direct pilot control. Though the XQ-58 is capable of conventional take-offs and landings, it can also be launched from "nondescript launch modules", such as support ships, shipping containers, and semi-trailer trucks. Kratos could produce between 250-500 Valkyries per year.

Operational history 
The XQ-58's first flight took place on 5 March 2019, approximately two and a half years from contract award. A total of five test flights were planned in two phases to evaluate system functionality, aerodynamic performance, and launch and recovery systems.

On 23 July 2020, the Air Force awarded contracts to Kratos, Boeing, Northrop Grumman, and General Atomics authorizing the companies to compete for the Skyborg program, an effort to field an unmanned wingman cheap enough to sustain losses in combat but capable of supporting manned fighters in hostile environments; Kratos may use the XQ-58 as its submission, although it was developed separately under the LCASD program and another airframe might be submitted. Kratos was further down-selected, along with Boeing and General Atomics, on 7 December 2020. Submissions were delivered by May 2021 for flight tests in July 2021.

On 26 March 2021, the XQ-58A completed its sixth test flight, opening the doors of its internal weapons bay for the first time and releasing a  Area-I Altius-600 small unmanned aircraft system (UAS).

Specifications

See also

References

External links
 Kratos XQ-58 Valkyrie page

Unmanned military aircraft of the United States
2010s United States experimental aircraft
Unmanned stealth aircraft
Aircraft first flown in 2019